is a Japanese manga series written and illustrated by Kazuto Okada. It was adapted into a live action film in 2013.

Characters
 Madoka Moritaka (Hitomi Komatani)
 Keigo Kakiguchi

References

External links
Official film website 

2013 comedy films
Akita Shoten manga
Romantic comedy anime and manga
Seinen manga
Manga adapted into films
Live-action films based on manga
Japanese comedy films
Japanese sex comedy films
2010s Japanese films